Stolnaya (Стольная) is a brand of vodka released by OST-Alco. The range consists of Stolnaya Special, Stolnaya Red Bilberry, which is made with cranberries, and Stolnaya Infusion which contains extracts of honey and pepper.

Trademark dispute
OST-Alco, distributors of the Stolnaya brand, has been involved in a running dispute with SPI Group, manufacturers of Stolichnaya brand vodka, concerning trademark rights.  SPI claims that the "Stolnaya" brand is confusingly similar to "Stolichnaya".  A number of jurisdictions, including the United Kingdom have withdrawn or refused registration of the Stolnaya brand because of SPI's objections.

References

External links 
 Stolnaya vodka
 Critics Reviews

Russian vodkas